Saaremaa is a village in Võru Parish, Võru County in southeastern Estonia. It has a population of 5 and an area of 1.4 km2.

References

Võru Parish
Villages in Võru County